Maryinskoye is a rural locality (a village) in Semyonkovskoye Rural Settlement, Vologodsky District, Vologda Oblast, Russia. The population was 59 as of 2002.

Geography 
The distance to Vologda is 12 km, to Semyonkovo is 4 km. Podberevskoye is the nearest rural locality.

References 

Rural localities in Vologodsky District